was the location of a castle in Matsuura District, Hizen Province, Japan. Today, the area is part of Chinzei in the city of Karatsu in Japan's Saga prefecture.

Toyotomi Hideyoshi made Nagoya his base for directing the invasion of Korea.

References

Geography of Saga Prefecture

ko:나고야 성 (사가 현)
ja:名護屋城
zh:名護屋城